Oracion Seis may refer to: 

 Oracion Seis (Rave Master), group in anime and manga series Rave Master
 Oracion Seis (Fairy Tail), group in anime and manga series Fairy Tail